Hebanthodes is a monotypic genus of flowering plants belonging to the family Amaranthaceae. The only species is Hebanthodes peruviana.

Its native range is Peru.

References

Amaranthaceae
Amaranthaceae genera
Monotypic Caryophyllales genera